Hardware River Wildlife Management Area is a  Wildlife Management Area (WMA) in Fluvanna County, Virginia. Its namesake is the Hardware River which provides a portion of its boundary and runs through its interior; however, it is known for the access it provides to the James River. The area's former farmland today hosts forests of oak, maple, and hickory, with stands of pure pine on the highest ground.

Hardware River Wildlife Management Area is owned and maintained by the Virginia Department of Game and Inland Fisheries. The area is open to the public for hunting, trapping, fishing, hiking, horseback riding, boating, and primitive camping. Access for persons 17 years of age or older requires a valid hunting or fishing permit, a current Virginia boat registration, or a WMA access permit.

See also
 List of Virginia Wildlife Management Areas

References

External links
Virginia Department of Game and Inland Fisheries: Hardware River Wildlife Management Area

Wildlife management areas of Virginia
Protected areas of Fluvanna County, Virginia